The Rickenbacker 330 is part of Rickenbacker's 300 series of guitars. The 330 entered the Rickenbacker product line in 1958, though at the time the 300 series of guitars was known as the "Capri" series. It was designed by the German luthier Roger Rossmeisl. The guitar is associated by many players with the jangle-rock sounds of bands from the 1960s and 1980s. The instrument incorporates many features standard on Rickenbacker guitars, including a three-ply maple/walnut neck, a shallow headstock angle, and a thick rosewood fretboard finished with clear conversion varnish. The 330 also features a body with Rickenbacker's "crescent moon" double-cutaway shape with sharp, unbound edges, and an "R"-shaped trapeze tailpiece. One idiosyncrasy of the guitar is its dual truss rods, which allow for the correction of problematic and unwanted twists, as well as curvature, of the guitar's neck. The 330 is equipped with a monaural jack plate, lacking the Rick-O-Sound stereo functionality of other Rickenbacker models such as the Rickenbacker 360.

The Rickenbacker 330, like all Rickenbacker models, is manufactured in the United States, specifically within the Rickenbacker factory located in Santa Ana, California. It is not mass-produced, but rather produced-to-order for dealers and individual customers. It carries a MSRP of $1,999.00. The 330 is the top-selling instrument within Rickenbacker's lineup, as stated by the company's CEO:

From 1970 to 1974 Rickenbacker offered the 331, or what became known as the "Light Show" guitar. This version had a built in light organ, with an external power supply.

Prior to 2008, this model was also available with an additional pickup (Model 340, 340/12 12 string version). Also offered as a twelve string version (Model 330/12 respectively). During the Rose Morris Rickenbacker export to the UK, this model was available as the model 1997, and the 340 was called the 1998. Rather than featuring the standard Rickenbacker slash-shaped sound hole, both guitars featured an f-shaped violin sound hole, which made these guitars instant collector's items.

Features

Model specs
 No. Frets 24 (originally 21 until 1970)
 Scale Length 62.9 cm (24")
 Neck Width at Nut 41.4 mm (1.63")
 Neck Width at 12th Fret 49.05 mm (1.931")
 Crown Radius 25.4 cm (10")
 Weight 3.6 kg (8.0 lbs.)
 Overall Length 100.3 cm (39")
 Overall Width 38.1 cm (15")
 Overall Depth 38.1 mm (1")
 Schaller Machine Heads

Rickenbacker 330s are optimized for and equipped with 10–46 gauge, compressed, round-wound strings:

Pickups
Modern 330s are equipped with Rickenbacker's Hi-Gain single-coil pickups. Formerly, the model came equipped with Rickenbacker's Toaster pickups. The Hi-Gains have noticeably higher output than the Toasters, though this has resulted in the character of the sound in current models being slightly different from that of the older, pre-1970s models. The sound of the old Toaster pickups has been associated with such musical acts as the Byrds and the Beatles, while the newer Hi-Gain pickups are more representative of the sound of groups such as the Smiths and R.E.M.

Fifth control knob
For each of the 330's two pickups there are two knobs that control tone and volume. However in 1961, a fifth "blend" knob was added to the guitar to expand the possible adjustment of the guitar's tone. This knob has several different functions, such as acting as a tone blender between pickups and as a general EQ between the bass and treble tones of the guitar. Its primary function, however, is to serve as a bass pickup volume equalizer, allowing for the generally louder neck pickup to be reduced to comparable levels of volume with the bridge pickup. The knob is a potentiometer wired in as a variable resistor between the neck pickup and the neck pickup's volume knob. Since it is only wired into the neck pickup side and not in the circuit of the bridge pickup, it only affects the volume of the neck pickup in both the neck and middle switch positions and has no effect in the bridge position. Turning the knob up (clockwise) increases the resistance — more resistance is more volume reduction prior to the signal reaching the volume knob. The potentiometer value on older models was 500k offering variable resistance from  0 - 500kΩ. More recent productions have a 330k potentiometer which offers a variable resistance from 0 - 330kΩ.

0.0047µF Hi-pass Filter Capacitor
Vintage Rickenbacker 330s included a 0.0047µF capacitor between the switch and the volume knob for the bridge/treble pickup. The capacitor filtered out lower frequencies resulting in a more trebly output. Some players credit this capacitor for creating the more vintage "jangly" tone as opposed to the much fuller sounding bridge pickup without the capacitor. A side effect of this capacitor was a volume reduction in the bridge pickup's output. This contributed to the need for the fifth control knob for balancing pickup volumes. The capacitor was removed from the circuit by the mid-1980's. A popular modification is to reintroduce the capacitor back into the circuit on more modern 330's, but it is usually attached to a push/pull potentiometer switch so it can be engaged by pulling up the knob and disengaged by pushing the knob back down - this allows for the more modern full bridge pickup sound as well as the thinner, more trebly sound.

Larger "Paddle" Headstock Period
Rickenbacker 330's feature a slim headstock shape, but from a period around 1984 until 2007, they changed the headstock size to a wider shape. Originally, this change was done to accommodate larger tuning keys as the company transitioned in the type of tuners they were using at the time. The headstock remained in place throughout the entirety of the 1990s and was phased out in 2007 due to a large demand for a return to the slimmer headstock style. The large headstock, due to its wide shape is often referred to as the "paddle headstock" for its resemblance to a boat paddle and is also sometimes referred to as the "Gumby" headstock, based on its resemblance to the clay animation figure's head shape.

Vintage reissue models were immune to the larger headstock changes and they maintained the slimmer headstock style throughout the entire "paddle" headstock period since these models were made to vintage specifications.

Notable players
Pete Townshend
Peter Buck of R.E.M.
 Paul Weller of the Jam & the Style Council
 Brix Smith of the Fall
 Johnny Marr of the Smiths
 Wendy Melvoin of Prince and the Revolution
 The Edge of U2 (12 string version) 
 Aviv Geffen
Carrie Brownstein of Sleater-Kinney
Joe Hawley of Tally Hall

References

External links
 Official Rickenbacker 330 Model Page
 John Hall (Rickenbacker CEO) Q&A

Rickenbacker guitars
Semi-acoustic guitars